Gautama, Gautam or Gotama may refer to:

Ancient sages and philosophers
 Akṣapāda Gautama, a Hindu sage and founder of the Nyaya school of Hindu philosophy: see Nyāya Sūtras
 Indrabhuti Gautama, chief disciple of Mahavira
 Gautama Buddha, the founder of Buddhism
 Gautama Maharishi, one of the Saptarshis in Hinduism who authored hymns in Mandala 1 of the Rigveda

Clans
 Gautam Brahmins, a sub-group of Hindu Brahmins in India
 Gautam Rajputs, a sub-clan of Rajputs found in North India

Etymology
Gautam (Etymology)

Nepali name
Gautam (Nepali name)

Gautam as first name
 Gautam Adani, Indian industrialist
 Gautam Bhatia (architect)
 Gautam Bhatia (lawyer)
 Gautam Choudhury, Indian musician
 Gautam Gambhir, Indian cricketer
 Gautam Gulati, Indian actor
 Gautham Krishn, South Indian actor
 Gautam Navlakha, a veteran activist from the People's Union for Democratic Rights, Delhi